Do Ji-han (born September 24, 1991) is a South Korean actor. He is best known for his supporting roles in the film The Tower (2012), which earned him a Baeksang Arts Award nomination for Best New Actor, and on the KBS2's television series Hwarang: The Poet Warrior Youth (2016–2017). He enlisted in the military on December 26, 2018.

Personal life
Jihan quietly enlisted for his mandatory military service as an active duty soldier on December 24, 2018. He first underwent five weeks of basic training at the Army's 12th Infantry Division in Gangwon Province.

Filmography

Film

Television series

Music videos

Awards and nominations

References

External links
 Do Ji-han at Yuleum Entertainment
 
 

Male actors from Seoul
1991 births
Living people
South Korean male television actors
South Korean male film actors